The 2011 UEFA Regions' Cup was the seventh edition of the UEFA Regions' Cup. The final tournament phase was held in Portugal, in the city of Braga. The cup was won by the hosts of the tournament, Braga, who beat Leinster & Munster from the Republic of Ireland in the final by 2 – 1.

Preliminary round 
The twelve teams in the preliminary round have been drawn into three group of four, with the following countries hosting each group's matches:
Group A –  Croatia
Group B –  Hungary
Group C –  Macedonia
Matches in the preliminary round were played between 1 August and 30 September 2010. The three group winners and the two best runners-up advance to the intermediary round (only the results of the runners-up against the winners and third-ranked team in each group are taken into account).

Group A

Group B

Group C

Best runners-up

1 The competition rules state that the two best runners-up qualify to the intermediary round, with only the results of the runners-up against the winners and third-ranked team in each group being taken into account. However, due to the Bosnian-Herzegovinian Football Federation being suspended by UEFA and FIFA as of 1 April 2011, Dalmatia, the worst runner-up, was allowed to progress to the intermediary round, replacing Bosnia-Herzegovina's representative team, Kanton Sarajevo, in Group 6.

Intermediary round 
The 26 teams which went straight through to the intermediary round (after the exclusion of Kanton Sarajevo from Bosnia-Herzegovina, due to their suspension) were joined by the three group winners and three runners-up from the preliminary round. The 32 teams have been drawn into eight groups of four, with the following countries hosting each group's matches:
Group 1 – 
Group 2 – 
Group 3 – 
Group 4 – 
Group 5 – 
Group 6 – 
Group 7 – 
Group 8 – 
Matches in the intermediary round were played between 1 August 2010 and 30 April 2011. The winners of each group will qualify for the final tournament.

Group 1

Group 2

Group 3

Group 4

Group 5 

2 The group winner was decided by drawing of lots between Belgrade and South West Bulgaria.

Group 6 

Result changed from 3–1 to 0–3, after fielding of an ineligible player by Dalmatia.

Group 7

Group 8

Final tournament
The final tournament was held in Braga District, Portugal from 21 to 28 June 2011.

Group stage

The group stage draw took place on 11 May 2011, producing two groups of four teams each. The two group winners advance to the final, while the runners-up of each group receive bronze medals.

Group A

Group B

Final

See also 
UEFA Regions' Cup

References

External links
Official UEFA Regions' Cup site

2011
Regions
2011
Regions